The Fossil Creek Volcanics is a geologic formation in Alaska. It preserves fossils dating back to the Ordovician period.

See also

 List of fossiliferous stratigraphic units in Alaska
 Paleontology in Alaska

References
 

Ordovician Alaska
Ordovician northern paleotropical deposits